The Panama men's national tennis team represents Panama in Davis Cup tennis competition and are governed by the Federación Panamena de Tenis.

Panama currently compete in the Americas Zone of Group III.  They have finished 3rd in Group III on two occasions.

History
Panama competed in its first Davis Cup in 1996.

Current team (2022) 

 José Gilbert Gómez
 Luis Gómez
 Marcelo Rodríguez
 Jorge Daniel Chevez
 Chad Valdés Jr. (Junior player)

See also
Davis Cup
Panama Fed Cup team

External links

Davis Cup teams
Davis Cup
Davis Cup